George James Welbore Agar-Ellis, 1st Baron Dover PC FRS FSA (14 January 179710 July 1833) was a British politician and man of letters. He was briefly First Commissioner of Woods and Forests under Lord Grey between 1830 and 1831.

Background and education
Agar-Ellis was the only son of Henry Agar-Ellis, 2nd Viscount Clifden, and Lady Caroline, daughter of George Spencer, 4th Duke of Marlborough. He was educated at Westminster School and Christ Church, Oxford. He was elected a Fellow of both the Society of Antiquaries and Royal Society in 1816.

Political career
Agar-Ellis was returned to Parliament for Heytesbury in 1818, a seat he held until 1820. He afterwards represented Seaford between 1820 and 1826, Ludgershall between 1826 and 1830 and Okehampton between 1830 and 1831. He supported George Canning's motion in 1822 for a bill to relieve the disabilities of Roman Catholic peers, and consistently supported liberal principles. He took little interest in party politics but was a strong advocate of state support for the causes of literature and the fine arts.

In 1824 Agar-Ellis was the leading promoter of the grant of £57,000 for the purchase of John Julius Angerstein's collection of pictures, which formed the foundation of the National Gallery. On the formation of Lord Grey's Whig administration in November 1830, he was sworn of the Privy Council and appointed First Commissioner of Woods and Forests. However, he was forced to resign after two months due to bad health.

In June 1831, during his father's lifetime, Agar-Ellis was raised to the peerage as Baron Dover, of Dover in the County of Kent. He was president of the Royal Society of Literature in 1832, a trustee of the British Museum and of the National Gallery, and a commissioner of public records.

Family

Lord Dover married his third cousin once removed Lady Georgiana Howard, daughter of George Howard, 6th Earl of Carlisle, in 1822. They had two sons, who became respectively the 3rd Viscount and 5th Viscount, and two daughters. He died on 10 July 1833, aged only 36, predeceasing his father by three years. Lady Dover died in March 1860.

Works
Lord Dover's works were chiefly historical, and include:
 The True History of the State Prisoner, Commonly Called the Iron Mask (1826)
 Inquiries respecting the Character of Clarendon (1827)
 a Life of Frederick II. (1831)
He also edited the Ellis Correspondence (1829) and Walpole's Letters to Sir Horace Mann (1833).

References

Attribution:

External links

 
 
 

1797 births
1833 deaths
Members of the Parliament of the United Kingdom for English constituencies
English non-fiction writers
People educated at Westminster School, London
People associated with the National Gallery, London
UK MPs 1818–1820
UK MPs 1820–1826
UK MPs 1826–1830
UK MPs 1830–1831
UK MPs who were granted peerages
Fellows of the Royal Society
Fellows of the Society of Antiquaries of London
Presidents of the Royal Society of Literature
Barons in the Peerage of the United Kingdom
Peers of the United Kingdom created by William IV
Members of the Privy Council of the United Kingdom
Heirs apparent who never acceded
English male non-fiction writers
Members of the Parliament of the United Kingdom for Okehampton
Committee members of the Society for the Diffusion of Useful Knowledge